Stat (stylized STAT, sometimes also called Stat News) is an American health-oriented news website launched on November 4, 2015, by John W. Henry, the owner of The Boston Globe. It is produced by Boston Globe Media and is headquartered in the Globes own building in Boston. Its executive editor is Rick Berke, who formerly worked at both The New York Times and Politico. According to Kelsey Sutton of Politico, the website is Henry's "biggest and most ambitious standalone site yet". The site's name comes from the term "stat", short for statim, or "immediately"—a term that has long been used in medical contexts.

As of February 2016, it had 45 staff members.

Impact
Notable stories Stat has broken include one about Robert Califf's research, published after then–President of the United States Barack Obama announced he would be his nominee to lead the Food and Drug Administration. The site also uncovered claims made by a vitamin company to which President Donald Trump had licensed his name. The site's reporting has also inspired another presidential candidate, Bernie Sanders, to return a contribution that a disgraced former pharmaceutical industry CEO made to his campaign. The site has also sent multiple journalists to Colombia, Haiti, and Brazil to cover the zika outbreaks there. Stat began covering the Coronavirus outbreak early, starting with an article by Helen Branswell on 4 January 2020. The site's early coverage led to a surge in reader traffic 4-5 times above typical volumes.

Remdesivir trial leak 
An April 16, 2020 article entitled "Early peek at data on Gilead coronavirus drug suggests patients are responding to treatment" by Adam Feuerstein contained early, incomplete results of a University of Chicago clinical trial of the COVID-19 drug remdesivir, which were leaked to STAT without permission. Shares of Gilead Sciences, the developer of remdesivir, jumped higher in after-hours trading immediately after the report was published. In a statement to CNBC, a University of Chicago spokesperson said, “Partial data from an ongoing clinical trial is by definition incomplete and should never be used to draw conclusions about the safety or efficacy of a potential treatment that is under investigation." Lloyd Doggett, chair of the House Ways and Means Health Subcommittee, called for an investigation of the leak, noting that "providing information that's designed to impact the stock market is not something that is permitted under federal securities law."

References

External links

American health websites
Internet properties established in 2015
The Boston Globe
American news websites